(born May 17, 1985, in Tomakomai, Japan) is a Japanese ice hockey goaltender.

International career

Nakaoku was selected for the Japan women's national ice hockey team in the 2014 Winter Olympics. She did not play, though she did dress and sit on the bench in one game.

Nakaoku also played for Japan in the qualifying event for the 2014 and 2010 Winter Olympics.

As of 2015, Nakaoku has also appeared for Japan at seven IIHF Women's World Championships, with the first in 2003.

Career statistics

International career
Through 2014–15 season

References

External links
Eurohockey.com Profile

1985 births
People from Tomakomai, Hokkaido
Sportspeople from Hokkaido
Living people
Olympic ice hockey players of Japan
Ice hockey players at the 2014 Winter Olympics
Japanese women's ice hockey goaltenders
Asian Games medalists in ice hockey
Ice hockey players at the 2007 Asian Winter Games
Ice hockey players at the 2011 Asian Winter Games
Medalists at the 2007 Asian Winter Games
Medalists at the 2011 Asian Winter Games
Asian Games silver medalists for Japan